General elections were held in Togo on 5 May 1963, alongside a constitutional referendum. It followed a military coup earlier in the year which had ousted (and killed) President Sylvanus Olympio, who had dissolved all political parties except his own Party of Togolese Unity in 1961. Nicolas Grunitzky, who had served as Prime Minister since shortly after the coup was elected president unopposed, whilst in the National Assembly election, a single list of candidates containing members of the Party of Togolese Unity, Juvento, the Democratic Union of the Togolese People and the Togolese People's Movement (all of which had 14 seats) was put forward under the name "Reconciliation and National Union". It was approved by 98.6% of voters. Voter turnout was 91.1%.

Results

President

National Assembly

References

Togo
1963 in Togo
Elections in Togo
Single-candidate elections
Presidential elections in Togo
May 1963 events in Africa